Clarksville is an unincorporated community partially in Lawrence Township, and partially in West Windsor Township, in Mercer County, New Jersey, United States. It was historically centered at the intersection of the Trenton-New Brunswick Turnpike, Quakerbridge Road and Province Line Road, and had a blacksmith shop, saloon, store, hotel and school. Today, Clarksville is dominated by several large shopping centers, including the Quaker Bridge Mall.

In October 2019, the Historical Society of West Windsor published an online museum exploring the history of West Windsor, including the history of Clarksville.

References

Lawrence Township, Mercer County, New Jersey
Unincorporated communities in Mercer County, New Jersey
Unincorporated communities in New Jersey